George Lawton may refer to:

 George Lawton (canoeist) (1911–?), British Olympic canoeist
 George Lawton (footballer, born 1862) (1862–1930), English footballer for Stoke
 George Lawton (footballer, born 1880) (1880–?), English footballer for Stoke
 George Lawton (settler) (1607–1693), early settler of Portsmouth in the Colony of Rhode Island and Providence Plantations
 George M. Lawton (1886–1941), American football player and coach
 George Willis Lawton, American architect and partner at Saunders and Lawton